Lorenzo Ward (born April 26, 1967) is an American football coach. He is the defensive coordinator at the University of Tennessee at Chattanooga, a position he has held since the 2019 season. Ward served as the interim head football coach at the University of Louisville for the final two games of the 2018 season following the firing of Bobby Petrino. Ward played college football at the University of Alabama from 1986 to 1989.

Playing career
Ward was born and raised in Greensboro, Alabama. A 1991 graduate of the University of Alabama, Ward played for the Crimson Tide from 1986 to 1989 under head coaches Ray Perkins (1986) and Bill Curry (1987-89).

Coaching career
Ward's first job was at his alma mater as a graduate assistant during the Tide's 1991 season. Ward then worked for the University of Tennessee, Chattanooga from 1994 to 1998.

In 1999, Ward was hired by Frank Beamer to join Virginia Tech's coach staff. Here, Ward coached the secondary and had five all-Big East players and one all-ACC player, including DeAngelo Hall. During his last year, the Hokies led the nation in total defense, allowing just 247.6 yards per game.

Ward then joined the Oakland Raiders for the 2006 before rejoining the college ranks at Arkansas (2008) and then as defensive coordinator at South Carolina from 2009 to 2015 under Steve Spurrier. At South Carolina, Ward was known for coaching Jadeveon Clowney.

Ward spent the 2016 season as the defensive coordinator at Fresno State before being hired by Louisville in 2017 as secondary coach.

On November 11, 2018, Louisville fired Bobby Petrino after the team's 2–8 start. Ward was named interim head coach and coached his first game in this role against N.C. State on November 17, 2018.

On June 4, 2019, the University of Tennessee at Chattanooga re-hired him to be the defensive coordinator.

Head coaching record

References

External links
 Chattanooga profile

1967 births
Living people
American football linebackers
American football safeties
Alabama Crimson Tide football players
Arkansas Razorbacks football coaches
Chattanooga Mocs football coaches
Fresno State Bulldogs football coaches
Louisville Cardinals football coaches
Oakland Raiders coaches
South Carolina Gamecocks football coaches
Virginia Tech Hokies football coaches
People from Greensboro, Alabama
Coaches of American football from Alabama
Players of American football from Alabama
African-American coaches of American football
African-American players of American football
21st-century African-American people
20th-century African-American sportspeople